Downing College is a constituent college of the University of Cambridge and currently has around 650 students. Founded in 1800, it was the only college to be added to Cambridge University between 1596 and 1869, and is often described as the oldest of the new colleges and the newest of the old. Downing College was formed "for the encouragement of the study of Law and Medicine and of the cognate subjects of Moral and Natural Science", and has developed a reputation amongst Cambridge colleges for Law and Medicine.

Downing has been named one of the two most eco-friendly Cambridge colleges.

History 

Upon the death of Sir George Downing, 3rd Baronet in 1749, the wealth left by his grandfather, Sir George Downing, 1st Baronet, who served both Cromwell and Charles II and built 10 Downing Street (a door formerly from Number 10 is in use in the college), was applied by his will. Under this will, as he had no direct issue (he was legally separated from his wife), the family fortune was left to his cousin, Sir Jacob Downing, 4th Baronet, and if he died without heir, to three cousins in succession. If they all died without issue, the estates were to be used to found a college at Cambridge called Downing.

Sir Jacob died in 1764, and as the other named heirs had also died, the college should have come into existence then, but Sir Jacob's widow, Margaret, refused to give up the estates and the various relatives who were Sir George's legal heirs had to take costly and prolonged action in the Court of Chancery to compel her to do so. She died in 1778 but her second husband and the son of her sister continued to resist the heirs-at-law's action until 1800 when the Court decided in favour of Sir George's will and George III granted Downing a Royal Charter, marking the official foundation of the college.

Buildings

The architect William Wilkins was commissioned by the trustees of the Downing estate, who included the Master of Clare College and St John's College and the Archbishops of Canterbury and York, to design the plan for the college. Wilkins, a disciple of the neo-classical architectural style, designed the first wholly campus-based college plan in the world based on a magnificent entrance on Downing Street reaching back to form the largest court in Cambridge, extending to Lensfield Road. But this was not to be.

The estate was much reduced by the suit in Chancery, and the grand plans failed. Much of the north side of what was then the Pembroke Leys was sold to the university and is now home to scientific buildings ("The Downing Site"). In fact, only limited East and West ranges were initially built, with the plans for a library and chapel on the south face of the college shelved.

The third side of the square was only completed in 1951 with the building of the college chapel. Where the fourth side would have been is now a large paddock (known simply as "The Paddock"), with many trees. Though not fully enclosed, the court formed before the Downing College is perhaps largest in Cambridge or Oxford (a title contested with Trinity College's Great Court). An urban legend amongst Cambridge students claims that Trinity pays an undisclosed sum to the college annually with the condition that it will never build the fourth side of the square, so that Trinity may maintain the distinction of having the largest enclosed court of all colleges of Cambridge.

The most recent building additions are the Howard Lodge accommodation, the Howard Building, and most recent of all the Howard Theatre which opened in 2010. These were sponsored by the Howard Foundation, and are located behind the main court around their own small garden. These facilities are used for conference and businesses gatherings outside the student term.

Heong Gallery 

The Heong Gallery, opened in February 2016, is a modern and contemporary art gallery at Downing.  It is named for Alwyn Heong, an alumnus of the college, who is a supporter of the visual arts. The conversion of a stables building by Caruso St John won a RIBA regional award.

Student life

Downing students remain prominent in the university world; in the past few years Cambridge Union Presidents, Blues captains, Law and Economic Society Presidents and more have hailed from the college. Downing has a particular reputation for law.

The Griffin has been the undergraduate student magazine for over 100 years.

Sport

The college fields teams in a range of sports including, men's football, men's and women's rugby, tennis and Ultimate Frisbee.

Downing College Boat Club is successful too, with the Women's first boat gaining Lents Headship of the river in 2004 and most recently in 2020, and the Mays Headship in the 2014 and 2015 May Bumps. The men's first boat has held the headship several times in the 1980s and 1990s (for example in 1994 to 1996) while gaining the Mays headship in 1996
and the Lents Headship in 2014, on each occasion recognising the tradition of "burning the boat" (using an old wooden 8 oared boat), while the rowers of the winning boat jump the flames. They both currently hold positions at or near the top in both University bumps races [Lents and Mays].

Gallery

People associated with Downing

The college is renowned for its strong legal tradition, being built up by Clive Parry, his pupil and successor John Hopkins and Graham Virgo. Legal notables who have been honorary fellows of the college include the late Sir John Smith, the pre-eminent criminal lawyer of his generation; Lord Collins of Mapesbury, the first solicitor to be appointed to the Court of Appeal and House of Lords; and Sir Robert Jennings, former President of the International Court of Justice.

Notable alumni

Fellows

References

Bibliography

External links

Downing College website
Downing JCR (Junior Combination Room) website
Downing MCR (Middle Combination Room) website
Downing College Alumni Association website

 
Colleges of the University of Cambridge
Educational institutions established in 1800
Grade I listed buildings in Cambridge
Grade I listed educational buildings
Neoclassical architecture in England
1800 establishments in England